Janine Boyd (born February 5, 1971) is an American politician who served as a member of the Ohio House of Representatives for the 9th district from 2015 to 2022. She resigned from her House seat in April 2022 to take a position in the United States Department of Health and Human Services.

Early life and education 
A native of Cleveland Heights, Ohio, Boyd graduated from the Beaumont School. She earned a Bachelor of Arts degree in Spanish from Hillsdale College in 1993 and a Master of Arts in speech and language pathology from Michigan State University in 1999. Boyd is the daughter of Barbara Boyd, who held the same seat from 1993 to 2000 and from 2007 to 2014.

Career 
Boyd previously served on council for Cleveland Heights, where she often faced criticism for her attendance. In 2012, she was appointed to council to replace Phyllis Evans. In 2014, she announced that she would seek to replace her mother, Barbara Boyd, in the Ohio House of Representatives. She faced Republican Charles Hopson in the general election, and went on to win 85%-15%.

During debate on an Ohio six-week abortion ban, banning abortion after detection of a "fetal heartbeat", Boyd drafted an amendment that would give an exemption to African American women, "whose history includes rape and forced birth imposed on enslaved women and black women after slavery". The amendment failed, and the bill was signed into law. A federal judge issued an injunction against the bill before it took effect.

In April 2022, Boyd was appointed by President Joe Biden to serve as a regional director of the United States Department of Health and Human Services for the fifth region, which covers Illinois, Indiana, Michigan, Minnesota, Ohio, and Wisconsin.

In late 2022, Boyd left the HHS to care for her ailing mother in Cleveland Heights. Her mother died in November 2022. In February 2023, City of Cleveland Heights Mayor Kahlil Seren appointed Boyd "to fill the vacant, unexpired term on Cleveland Heights City Council ending 12/31/2023."

References

External links
Campaign website
Campaign Facebook page

1971 births
Living people
Democratic Party members of the Ohio House of Representatives
People from Cleveland Heights, Ohio
Women state legislators in Ohio
Ohio city council members
African-American women in politics
Women city councillors in Ohio
African-American state legislators in Ohio
21st-century American politicians
21st-century American women politicians
African-American city council members in Ohio
21st-century African-American women
21st-century African-American politicians
20th-century African-American people
20th-century African-American women
Hillsdale College alumni
Michigan State University alumni